John McLeod may refer to:

Politics
 John McLeod (New Brunswick politician) (1825–?), shipbuilder and assembly member
 John McLeod (New Zealand politician) (1825–1883), MP for Mongonui
 John McLeod (Ontario politician) (1833–1879), member of the Ontario legislature
 John McLeod (Canada West politician) (1816–1887), merchant, shipbuilder and politician in Canada West
 John R. McLeod (1872–1931), politician from Alberta

Sports
 John McLeod (basketball) (born 1934), Canadian basketball player
 John McLeod (Jamaican cricketer) (born 1931), Jamaican cricketer
 John McLeod (New Zealand cricketer) (born 1947), New Zealand cricketer
 John McLeod (footballer, born 1866) (1866–1953), Scottish football goalkeeper (Dumbarton FC and Scotland)
 John McLeod (footballer, born 1888) (1888 – after 1912), Scottish football full back (Inverness Caledonian, Bury and Darlington)
 Jackie McLeod (1930–2022), Canadian ice hockey player and coach
 Jack McLeod (rugby league), New Zealand international
 John McLeod (rugby league) (born 1957), Australian rugby league player

Other
 John McLeod (explorer) (1795–?), Canadian fur trader and explorer
 John McLeod (composer) (1934–2022), Scottish composer
 John McLeod (songwriter), songwriting partner of Tony Macaulay
 John Bryce McLeod (1929–2014), British mathematician
 John P. McLeod, Australian writer and broadcaster
 John McLeod (card game researcher) (born 1949), English card game historian and researcher
 Sir John Chetham McLeod, Scottish British Army officer and colonial administrator
 John McLeod (surgeon), Scottish naval surgeon and author

See also
 John MacLeod (disambiguation)
 Jack McLeod (disambiguation)
 John McLeod Campbell (1800–1872), Scottish minister
 John McLeod Murphy (1827–1871), U.S. naval officer during the American Civil War